B-PROJECT is a Japanese cross-media project by MAGES. about a group of virtual idols that began in 2015. The project was first announced via Twitter on August 9, 2015, with the first production presentation and song previews being released on September 4, 2015, via nico live. As of January 2018 the project features an anime series, a manga adaptation, a rhythm game, a stage play, multiple music CDs, and a range of related merchandise.

Overview
B-PROJECT follows four (initially three) Japanese idol groups that perform both as separate units and as a whole group. When the project first began the units were: , THRIVE and MooNs, but on December 4, 2015, a fourth group known as KiLLER KiNG was added. The first single for the series, "", was released digitally on September 11, 2015, alongside a promo video for the series and a teaser of a new single, "dreaming time", from THRIVE. It was later revealed that in addition to "dreaming time" from THRIVE, MooNs & Kitakore would also be releasing singles on November 25, 2015, "Glory Upper" and "" respectively.

Shortly after the introduction of KiLLER KiNG the next round of singles was announced on January 24, 2016. KiLLER KiNG's debut single would be "", THRIVE's new single would be "Maybe Love", Kitakore's new single would be "Mysterious Kiss", and MooNs' new single would be "Brand New Star". Unlike the first round of singles the release dates were split into two batches; "Kira Kira Smile" and "Maybe Love" were released on March 23, 2016, while "Mysterious Kiss" and "Brand New Star" weren't released until April 6, 2016.

On September 9, 2016, it was announced that from December 2016 to March 2017 there would be six consecutive releases, with at least one single from each unit. The releases began on December 21, 2016, with the release of "" by B-Project as a whole, and "Hungry Wolf" by KiLLER KiNG. The next single, "Summer Mermaid" by MooNs, was released January 18, 2017. "Needle No.6" by THRIVE was released on February 22, 2017, while "" by Kitakore was set to be released on February 8, 2017, but was pushed back to March 15, 2017, the same release day as KiLLER KiNG's next single, Break it down, for unspecified reasons.

On March 19, 2017, alongside the announcement of the stage play production it was announced that B-Project would be releasing its first album. Two versions were released with different tracklists: S-Kyuu Paradise BLACK & S-Kyuu Paradise WHITE, both albums were released on July 19, 2017. The first song on both albums, "", is a new song sung by all 14 members, and each unit also released a new song: THRIVE and KiLLER KiNG on BLACK, and Kitakore and MooNs on WHITE. On June 9, 2017, the album covers were revealed and the titles for the four new songs were announced; "the one& only" by THRIVE, "Blooming Festa!" by KiLLER KiNG, "" by Kitakore, and "PRAY FOR..." by MooNs, along with previews for the THRIVE and Kitakore songs.

On September 30, 2017, at the second anniversary event, DARK in the HALLOWEEEEN, it was announced that the anime series would be receiving a second season at some point in the future, as well as announcing the fourth round of singles for each unit alongside new solo songs from all 14 members. On January 28, 2018, at the WINTER of FANTASIA event at Universal Studios Japan it was announced that there would be a new live show in July 2018, B-PROJECT SUMMER LIVE2018, as well as announcing the names and release dates of the fourth round of singles. The first singles released were "" by KiLLER KiNG and "" by THRIVE which both released on March 18, 2018, followed by "GO AROUND" by MooNS which was released on May 16, 2018. "" by Kitakore and "" by B-Project which was released on July 16, 2018.

On November 28, 2018, a compilation album containing all the opening, ending and character songs from the first season of the anime, titled  was released. On the same day, it was revealed the opening and ending themes for the second season of the anime were revealed,  and  respectively.

In total, the series has seen the release of 21 singles, and three albums, with another single slated for release in 2019. In addition to musical releases B-Project also features an anime produced by MAGES that ran during the Summer of 2016 for a total of 12 episodes, a manga written by Morino Mizu that ran for 6 chapters in late 2016 in the monthly magazine Cheese!, an ongoing web-radio series, a mobile musical game, and stage play. The anime was later released in 6 DVD & Blu-ray volumes; volumes 2-6 came packaged with 2 character songs each, 1 song for each unit member who made an appearance in the anime. The series has also seen a variety of special events, all of which have taken place in Japan and usually feature several of the voice actors from the series. These events have usually been to announce upcoming singles or projects, however two have been to celebrate the anniversary of the series. So far the series has seen the following special events: Happy Summer Eastar, KING of CASTE, Brilliant＊Party, LOVE & ART FAMILY MTG 2017, DARK in the HALLOWEEEEN, and WINTER of FANTASIA. For April Fools in 2017 there was an announcement on the official Twitter saying that the B in B-Project stood for baby, this was accompanied by a voting poll for who the fans most wanted to see become an adult again which lasted until April 9. The top 3 ranked characters, Kento Aizome, Goshi Kaneshiro, and Ryuji Korekuni, had limited edition life-sized body pillow covers made as a result of the voting poll. For 2018 April Fools the official Twitter revealed a continuation of last year's Baby-Project, known as Kids-Project, which showed the characters as pre-school children.

Characters

Idol Groups and Members

MooNs

 Played by: Tatsuki Jōnin
The "eye candy" of the idol group, MooNs. In episode 7, it is revealed that Hikaru has an incurable disease. He has had it since before the auditions for B-Pro. It is also known that Nome has known about this when they met at the auditions which causes him to have a protective personality when it comes to Hikaru. His representative animal is a monkey.

 Played by: Yūhei Chiwata
MooNs' "musclebound idiot" He and Hikaru share a deep friendship as they were shown to have met in the auditions for B-Pro and have been together since then. His representative animal is a bear.

 Played by: Ryō Taguchi
 He is called MooNs' Leader but doesn't agree to it but nevertheless accepts it for the time being. He is quite conscious of Tomohisa's actions. He also thinks that Tomohisa shines brighter that anyone while not considering his own brightness. The MooN's members are fond of him as seen in episode 3. His representative animal is a dog.

 Played by: Tsubasa Kizu
MooNs' member. In episode 6, it is revealed that he can see avenging spirits in items. A very quiet cool type of person unlike Sekimura. He is close to Mikado. His representative animal is a hedgehog.

 Played by: Jin Hiramaki
He is the most energetic idol of the group. He is a really huge fan of Mamirin. He keeps a keychain of Mamirin on his bag, and keeps it as a good luck charm. He knows about Onzai's ability to see spirits and also is very close to him. His representative animal is a squirrel.

Kitakore (キタコレ)

 Played by: Toman
 A shy person who naturally can't confess his emotions easily. He is mostly seen with a candy in his mouth, mostly a lollipop. In the past, his mother would dress him up in girl clothes because he looked cute. His family is famous in the Entertainment business. He has been bullied due to people thinking he used his father's influence to get into B-Project. His representative animal is a cat.

 Played by: Yoshihide Sasaki
 He is a confident and also a rich person since his family runs a hospital although his personality says otherwise. He is very close to Ryūji who is in the same idol group as him. They share a close friendship since they met at a party when they were younger. At the party, he met Ryuji who was wearing girl's clothes at that time which causes Tomohisa to think he was really a girl. He cares for Masunaga whom he had also known for a long time. He is known as the "Prince". His representative animal is a lion.

THRIVE

 Played by: Yuta Kishimoto
 Goshi is considered the non-conformist of the group. He enjoys composing and prefers to maintain his more mature, rock-influenced image. He has a short temper and is often teased by his group members. His representative animal is a wolf.

 Played by: Reo Mitani
 He is the playboy type in the group. He is mostly seen holding a mirror and fixing his bangs and according to Tsubasa, is always alert and pays attention to his surroundings. In episode 9, it was seen that he gets really annoyed when his bangs gets messed up. It was also revealed that he had a bit of a rough childhood causing him to have a play boy personality. His representative animal is a fox.

 Played by: Tom Fujita
Yuta is the cute idol of the group. Has a cheerful, bright, and energetic personality but is also quite self-conscious about his nature. He is friendly with almost every member of B-project, and is closest to Kitakore's Ryuji outside of THRIVE. His representative animal is a sheep.

KiLLER KiNG

 Played by: Shōichirō Ōmi
One of the twins, much quieter than his brother and appears to be a bit shy. His representative animal is a rabbit.

 Played by: Ryō Takizawa
One of the twins, the more extroverted and talkative of the two like his band-mate, Akane. His representative animal is a rabbit.

 Played by: Shunya Ōhira
Like Yuta of THRIVE, Akane seems to be the cute idol of his group and appears to be quite talkative and friendly. His representative animal is a pig.

 Played by: Shōta Kawakami
Like Yuzuki or Nome of MooNs, Miroku seems to be the quiet and stoic type of idol. His representative animal is a panther.

Anime-only Characters

The main protagonist of the series. At the start of the anime, it was said she was suddenly hired to work at Gandara Music by the chairman of the company. Tsubasa appears shy when she first meets the boys, but slowly becomes more outgoing as the series goes on. She also has a very keen hearing ability, being able to distinguish any type of distinction in both music and nature. When asked how she came to develop such an ability, she replies that she was musically influenced by her father. She now works as the A&R of the all-boy group, B-Pro. It is later revealed in the second season of the anime that Tsubasa's father was a famous composer named Yu Saikai.

Yashamaru is the company director of Gandara Music and Tsubasa's boss. B-Pro is extremely close to him since he was the one who created their group. He also trains Tsubasa to become an A&R. However, it is later revealed in the final episode of the anime's first season that creating B-Pro and hiring Tsubasa was part of his revenge plot against Tsubasa's father, whom he claimed had "killed" his family. In the second season of the anime, he quits working at Gandara Music and is now an employee at another agency, Highedge Records. It is revealed that Yashamaru had a younger sister who was once an up-and-coming idol, but her career was hindered due to her frail health. She died ten years ago prior to the start of the series, due to the shock of not being able to sing a song made by Tsubasa's father, Yu Saikai. Yashamaru decided to avenge her death by destroying anyone who was associated with Saikai. However, because Saikai died twelve years ago prior to the start of the series, he decided to make Tsubasa, who was Saikai's daughter, suffer in her father's place.

He is the president of the public entertainment office, Daikoku Productions which he established alongside his younger brother Shūji. His entertainment office represents Kitakore and MooNs. He is also on good terms with Tsubasa and he assists her when she needs it most.

He is the younger brother of Atsushi Daikoku. He established Daikoku Productions alongside Atsushi, but he soon left the company to establish his own public entertainment office, Brave Productions. His entertainment office represents THRIVE and KiLLER KiNG. Like Atsushi, Shūji is also on good terms with Tsubasa and he assists her when she needs it most.

Media

Manga
On April 8, 2016, shortly after the announcement of the anime series it was revealed that a manga series known as "" would begin serialization in the magazine "Cheese!" the following month. The series began on May 24, 2016, and concluded on October 24, 2016, after 6 chapters, the series focused largely on the units of THRIVE and KiLLER KNG.

Video games
Pre-registration has opened on the game's website and will remain open until the game's release, with users receiving bonuses for collectively clearing certain "stages" of pre-registration (stages are determined by the number of people signed up so far), the most recent stage to be cleared was 700,000+ users. At the LOVE & ART FAMILY MTG 2017 event in March a small preview of the game and how to play it was available for attendees to play. The game involves putting on performances to B-Project songs with the characters you have obtained, it also has a story mode including some chapters in a visual novel game style. In a live broadcast on nicovideo on June 9, 2017, it was announced that the game would finally be released in the second half of June. It was then announced on June 27 via Twitter that the game would be released the next day, on June 28, 2017. Owing to an unexpected number of users, the game was largely in maintenance for its first week so that the servers could be upgraded to handle the increased amount of activity.

At the 2018 live, B-PROJECT SUMMER LIVE 2018 ETERNAL PACIFIC, it was announced that the game would be receiving a renewal including a major overhaul to the interface and certain features, including significant changes to the rhythm section of the game. Few details were initially released other than the fact it was slated for an early 2019 release, though later updates revealed that the game would receive a new name along with the renewal now being labelled . The renewal eventually went live on May 20, 2019, after several days of maintenance; to celebrate the release players received a weeks worth of free 10-card pulls in the games photo feature.

At the B-PROJECT Thrive Live 2020 -Music Drugger- event, a console game developed for the Nintendo Switch titled B-PROJECT Ryūsei*Fantasia (B-PROJECT Shooting Star*Fantasia) was announced. On July 1, 2021, it was announced that the game will be released in Japan on September 30, 2021, for Nintendo Switch, iOS, and Android.

Radio
The first release in the series was the web-radio show, premiering on September 7, 2015, on nicovideo and known as "B-Project Radio: Gandara Broadband". The radio series currently has 16 installments as of December, 2016, but also often hosts special announcements and messages, such as the special broadcasts done as part of the first anniversary and the announcement of special events such as KING of CASTE.

Stage play
On March 19, 2017, it was announced that the series would be seeing the release of a stage play called "B-PROJECT on STAGE『OVER the WAVE!』" beginning July 28, 2017, and ending on August 17, 2017. Along with the play's announcement the first round of casting was released with one character from each unit being revealed. A second run of the play, entitled OVER the WAVE! REMiX was announced on January 10, 2018, with most of the original cast returning to reprise their roles; Tomohisa, Momo, & Hikaru were recast due to scheduling conflicts with the original actors. The REMiX play ran from February 22, 2018, until March 3, 2018.

Anime
On March 26, 2016, at AnimeJapan MAGES. announced that B-PROJECT would be receiving an anime adaptation called  in the Summer of 2016. The series began airing in Japan on July 3, 2016, and ran for a total of 12 episodes before concluding on September 25, 2016. The series focuses on the units of Kitakore, MooNs and THRIVE, with KiLLER KiNG only making a brief, non-voiced cameo in one episode, as well as featuring several unique characters that have not appeared in any other media for the series as of yet. The character designs were done by Toshie Kawamura, who previously worked on the character designs for Yes! PreCure 5 and Smile PreCure!. Series producer and songwriter Takanori Nishikawa also made a brief cameo in the fourth episode as fellow performer Nishiyama.

The second ending theme is STARLIGHT by THRIVE.

The story follows Tsubasa, a new hire in the A&R department of the major recording company Gandara Music. Tsubasa is immediately assigned to oversee the idol unit "B-PROJECT," which is made up of three idol groups: Kitakore, THRIVE, and MooNs. This is Tsubasa's first job, and she gets involved in various incidents and accidents as she deals with this group of young men who each have their own differing personalities.

A second season was announced at the 2017 DARK in the HALLOWEEEEN event. The series is titled , and it premiered from January 11 to March 29, 2019. The second season will consist of new staff members, with Makoto Moriwaki replacing Eiji Suganuma as director, and Ryosuke Nakanashi replacing Masato Nakayama as music composer. Nozomu Ōshima and MAGES. will be in charge of series composition, and Yumiko Hara will handle character designs. Bandai Namco Pictures is credited for production. Returning staff members include Takanori Nishikawa as producer, and Chiyomaru Shikura, who is credited for planning and original work. The anime cast will also reprise their roles, with the exception of Hisako Kanemoto, who announced in May 2018 that she would be going on hiatus to study abroad until March 2019. She was replaced by Asami Seto who voiced Tsubasa Sumisora for the anime's second season.

Season two saw the introduction of the members of KiLLER KiNG to the anime's storyline, as they were absent from the first season (except for a minor cameo in a flashback episode).

A third season was announced at the B-PROJECT Thrive Live 2020 -Music Drugger- event.

Season 1

Season 2

Music

References

External links
 

2016 anime television series debuts
2019 anime television series debuts
2017 video games
A-1 Pictures
Android (operating system) games
Bandai Namco Pictures
IOS games
Kadokawa Dwango franchises
Shogakukan manga
Shōjo manga
Upcoming anime television series
Tokyo MX original programming